The Other People (also known as Sleep is Lovely and I Love You, I Hate You)  is a 1968 British film. The film appears to have never been released, and is considered a lost film. It was discovered at Paramount in 2017 and will be preserved.

Plot
Peter can't get over his ex-girlfriend Elsa even though they broke up over a year ago. He spends all his time on a barge owned by his friend John and John's younger brother Colin. One morning Peter, John and Colin see a middle aged man, Clive, fall out of a motor cruiser into the water. They rescue him and decide to ransom him for £1,000. Peter and Elsa are-reunited but Elsa then commences an affair with Colin. Clive turns out to be Elsa's father.

Cast
Peter McEnery as Peter
Donald Pleasence as Clive, Elsa's father
Olga Georges-Picot as Elsa
John McEnery as John
George Coulouris as police inspector
Bruce Robinson as Colin
Colin Jeavons as butler
William Ellis as Royal Marines officer
Virginia Wetherell as girl at airport

Production
Producer Michael Deeley said director David Hart "was one of the cleverest men I have met and when he decided to be a film director it seemed like a good idea for me to help him." The film was set up at Deeley's Oakhurst Productions and financed by Paramount Pictures as part of a low-budget film state ordered by the studio's new owner, Charles Bluhdorn.

The film was passed to the BBFC for certification in September 1968, but despite the cast involved and backing of Oakhurst Productions and Paramount Pictures, it does not appear to have had a trade screening, been shown to a paying audience, screened on TV or released on video.

In 2017 elements of the film were discovered in the archive at Paramount in Los Angeles. The film will be preserved.

See also
List of lost films

References

External links

Sleep Is Lovely entry at the British Film Institute

1968 films
1960s lost films
Lost British films
Films scored by John Dankworth
1960s English-language films